Ganaveh or Gonaveh or Ganaweh or Genaveh may refer to:

 Bandar Ganaveh, a city in Bushehr Province
 Ganaveh, Deyr, a village in Bushehr Province
 Ganaveh County, in Bushehr Province
 Gonaveh, Kohgiluyeh and Boyer-Ahmad
 Ganaveh, Lorestan